Perry Titus Wells Hale (October 7, 1878 – April 8, 1948) was an American football player and coach. He played college football at Yale University was selected to the 1900 College Football All-America Team as a fullback. Hale also played professionally for the 1901 Homestead Library & Athletic Club football team. That season, he also coached the Phillips Exeter Academy football team and joined Homestead in mid-November after Exeter’s last game. Hale then served as the sixth head football coach at Ohio State University from 1902–1903, compiling a record of 14–5–2. He was 0–2 against Michigan.

After his football career, Hale was the water manager for Middletown, Connecticut. He was arrested in May 1910 for misapplying city funds. Hale stated that the $5,000 shortfall was due to an accounting error. A subsequent investigation found the charges to be groundless.

He died of heart disease in 1948. He had been blinded as a result of an explosion in 1913. In 1923 he was elected tax collector for Portland, CT and held that position until his death in 1948.

Head coaching record

References

Bibliography
 Notes of the Football Players New York Times October 17, 1901
 Admits Accounts Are Short: But Hale Old Yale Fullback is Not Worrying Over Charge New York Times May 4, 1910

External links
 

1878 births
1948 deaths
American football fullbacks
Homestead Library & Athletic Club players
Ohio State Buckeyes football coaches
Phillips Exeter Academy people
Yale Bulldogs football players
High school football coaches in New Hampshire
All-American college football players
People from Portland, Connecticut